Mary Lou Lord/Sean Na Na is a split EP released in February 2000 by indie label Kill Rock Stars. It features three songs each by Sean Na Na and singer/songwriter Mary Lou Lord.

Track listing
 Mary Lou Lord - "Bang Bang"
 Mary Lou Lord - "Hard Road"
 Mary Lou Lord - "Aim Low"
 Sean Na Na - "Princess and the Pony"
 Sean Na Na - "Stretch Marks"
 Sean Na Na - "My Old France"

References                 

2000 EPs
Mary Lou Lord albums
Split EPs
Kill Rock Stars EPs